Nelvin Riaan Hanamub (born 8 February 1995) is a Namibian international footballer who plays as a defender for Chippa United.

Career statistics

Club

Notes

International

References
 

1995 births
Living people
Namibian men's footballers
Namibia international footballers
Jomo Cosmos F.C. players
Chippa United F.C. players
AmaZulu F.C. players
2019 Africa Cup of Nations players
People from Otjozondjupa Region
Association football defenders
Namibian expatriate footballers
Expatriate soccer players in South Africa
Namibian expatriate sportspeople in South Africa